Masenyani Richard Baloyi was the Minister of Co-operative Governance and Traditional Affairs under South African President Jacob Zuma, from 2009 to 2014. Before, he was Minister of Public Service and Administration in Kgalema Motlanthe's cabinet (25 September 2008 to 9 May 2009).

References

See also

African Commission on Human and Peoples' Rights
Constitution of South Africa
History of the African National Congress
Politics in South Africa
Provincial governments of South Africa

Living people
Government ministers of South Africa
Year of birth missing (living people)